Sukumaran Karthik (born 5 March 1990) is an Indian cricketer. He made his first-class debut for Puducherry in the 2018–19 Ranji Trophy on 22 December 2018. He had earlier played in the Tamil Nadu Premier League.

References

External links
 

1990 births
Living people
Indian cricketers
Pondicherry cricketers
Place of birth missing (living people)